(née Hirao; born August 30, 1975) is an athlete from Japan, who competes in triathlon. She competed at the first Olympic triathlon at the 2000 Summer Olympics.  She took seventeenth place with a total time of 2:04:18.70. She also competed at the second Olympic triathlon at the 2004 Summer Olympics.  She took twelfth place with a total time of 2:07:34.02.

References

External links
 Akiko Sekine at 2004 Japanese Olympic Committee website
 

1975 births
Living people
Japanese female triathletes
Triathletes at the 2000 Summer Olympics
Triathletes at the 2004 Summer Olympics
Olympic triathletes of Japan
Sportspeople from Kitakyushu
Triathletes at the 2006 Asian Games
Asian Games medalists in triathlon
Asian Games bronze medalists for Japan
Medalists at the 2006 Asian Games
20th-century Japanese women
21st-century Japanese women